English singer Yungblud has released three studio albums, one live album, six EPs, twenty-seven singles (including one as featured artist), and twenty-two music videos. His second studio album, Weird!, and his self-titled third album both reached number one on the UK Albums Chart. Weird! is Gold in the United Kingdom.

Albums

Studio albums

Live albums

Extended plays

Singles

As lead artist

As featured artist

Charity singles

Guest appearances

Music videos

Notes

References

Discography
Discographies of British artists